The Nepal Bar Association (NBA) is the parent bar association of all the bar units throughout Nepal. 

Established in 1956, Nepal Bar Association has been fundamental in the development of the legal field in Nepal. It has played a vital role in the bar and bench relation, independence of judiciary, human rights, people's movement and the overall development of the legal field in Nepal.

Executive Committee  

Gopal Krishna Ghimire, President

Hark Bahadur Rawal,
Vice President, Bagmati Province

Birendra K.C.,
Vice President Gandaki Province

Pashupati Bhandari,
Vice President, Lumbini Province

Suraj Khatri,
Vice President, Province No. 1

Tula Ram Giri,
Vice President, Sudhur Pachim Province

Uttam Prasad Acharya,
Vice President, Karnali Province

Sudhir Kumar Karna,
Vice President, Madhesh Province

Asha Rai,
Vice President, (Women) Open Area

Anjita Khanal,
Secretary General

Bharat Bahadur Raut,
Treasurer

Sharmila Thapa Bista,
Member (Out of Valley Open Area)

Bharat Kumar Lakai,
Member

Devi Prasad Koirala,
Member

Kiran Kumari Shah,
Member (Madhase/Muslim) Out of Valley

Narayan Das Rai,
Member (Adibasi/Janajati) Out of Valley

Naresh Kumar Shah,
Member (Madhase/Muslim)

Nirvaya Raj Paudel,
Member

Santosh Kumar Raut,
Member

Guna Raj Acharya,
Member

Rup Bahadur Saru,
Member (Adibasi/Janajati)

Jeetendra Bahadur Madai,
Member Out of Valley

Binita Nepali,
Member (Dalit)

Sita Poudyal,
Member (Women, Out of Valley)

Santosh Tiwari,
Member

See also 
Nepal Bar Council

References

External links
 Nepal Bar Association official website

Nepalese lawyers
Bar associations of Asia
1956 establishments in Nepal